The Cameroon women's national basketball team is the nationally controlled basketball team representing Cameroon at world basketball competitions for women.

African Championship record
1983 – 3rd
1984 – 3rd
1986 – 4th
1997 – 7th
2003 – 8th
2007 – 6th
2009 – 7th
2011 – 6th
2013 – 4th
2015 – 2nd
2017 – 8th
2019 – 10th
2021 – 3rd
2023 – Qualified

Current roster
Roster for the 2021 Women's Afrobasket.

References

External links

FIBA profile

Women's team
Women's national basketball teams
National sports teams of Cameroon